Louis Marin (7 February 1871 – 23 May 1960) was a French politician who was Minister for the Liberated Regions  in 1924, Minister of Pensions (Veteran Affairs) in 1926–1928 and Minister of Health in 1934.

Life

Early years
Louis Marin was born on 7 February 1871 in Faulx, Meurthe.
a small village in the part of Lorraine that remained French after the settlement of the Franco-Prussian War of 1870.
His father was a notary. His mother died during his birth.
He attended the Malgrange College, near Nancy, then studied in the Faculty of Law of Nancy before moving to Paris, where he settled in the Latin Quarter.
Marin was an avid reader and also had a love of travel.
He visited Germany in 1891 and Romania and Serbia the next year, then Algeria.
In 1893 he joined the Society of Ethnography that Claude Bernard had founded.
He became a permanent member in 1900 and president of the society in 1920.

In 1899 Marin visited Greece, Poland, Russia, Scandinavia, Armenia, Turkestan, Central Asia and Western China.
In 1901 he traveled in Siberia, Manchuria, Korea and northern China.
Marin was present when the Summer Palace in Beijing was looted and burned.
In 1902 he visited Spain and Portugal, and in 1903 visited Asia Minor.
In all his travels Marin wanted to apply the concepts of Pierre Guillaume Frédéric le Play and the Ecole d'économie sociale in studying societies.
He became involved in the School of Anthropology that Paul Broca had established in 1876, and from 1923 was director of this school.

Early political career
In 1903 Marin was one of the founding members of the Republican Federation (Fédération républicaine), the largest conservative party during the French Third Republic.
He was a lifelong member of this organization, which became the Entente démocratique in 1914 and the Union républicaine démocratique in 1924. In 1924 he was elected president of the group, and in 1925 president of the party. In October 1905 he ran successfully for election as a deputy for the first district of Nancy in a by-election. He was reelected in the same constituency in each election up to World War II. In 1910 he was elected to represent the canton of Nomény in the general council of Meurthe-et-Moselle. He was president of the general council for eighteen years.
Marin was extremely active in parliament, involved in many committees and initiating many bills or resolutions. Although his party was right-wing, his political stance was generally moderate and liberal.
In 1914 Marin volunteered for the 24th battalion of chasseurs, but returned to sit in the legislature.

Inter-War period
Marin was Minister for the Liberated Regions from 29 March 1924 to 14 June 1924 in the third cabinet of Raymond Poincaré and the short-lived cabinet of Frédéric François-Marsal.
In 1925 he founded the weekly paper La Nation, and regularly wrote the paper's editorial.
He was Minister of Pensions from 23 July 1926 to 11 November 1928 in the Poincaré cabinet.
In 1931 he chaired the commission of inquiry into the Oustric Affair.
He was Minister of Health and Physical Education from 9 February 1934 to 8 November 1934 in the cabinet of Gaston Doumergue.
He was Minister of State from 8 November 1934 to 24 January 1936.

World War II
Marin was again Minister of State from 10 May 1940 to 16 June 1940 - the crucial period beginning with the German invasion of the Low Countries and ending with defeat in the Battle of France.
Marin refused to take part in the vote on 10 July 1940 that gave full powers to Marshal Philippe Pétain.
He became involved with the French Resistance as a symbol of the Catholic Right Republicans, and was involved in various non-communists groups. He became a captain of the French Forces of the Interior (Forces françaises de l'intérieur, FFI).
He reached London on 10 April 1944 after the Gestapo had issued a warrant for his arrest.
Marin was a member of the Provisional Consultative Assembly in 1944–45.
General Charles de Gaulle offered him a position in the provisional government, but he declined. 
He received various awards for his activities during the occupation of France.

Later career
Marin participated in the trial of Philippe Pétain in July–August 1945.
He resumed his research and teaching activities, and relaunched La Nation as a morning paper in which he published long editorials.
Marin was elected to the first Constituent Assembly on 21 October 1945, and to the second Constituent Assembly on 2 June 1946.
He opposed both draft constitutions. 
After the second constitution was chosen by the Assembly and ratified by plebiscite, he was elected to the first legislature of the French Fourth Republic  in November 1946. 
He was defeated in the general elections of 17 June 1951, and failed to be elected to the Council of the Republic on 18 May 1952.
That year he resigned his presidency of the general council of Meurthe-et-Moselle.
He remained active in the academic world and continued to publish works on political or ethnographical subjects.
Louis Marin  died on 23 May 1960 in Paris at the age of 89.

Science and academy 
Marin traveled in Europe and Asia from the age of 19 to the age of 34. He was a member of the Collège libre des sciences sociales (College of Social Sciences), where he taught ethnography from 1895 to 1935, of the Société Ethnographique de France (Ethnography Society), of the École d'anthropologie (School of Anthropology), which he chaired from 1923, of the Société de géographie commerciale (Commercial Geography Society), which he chaired from 1925 to 1960, of the Société française de pédagogie (French Pedagogical Society), of the Société des Amis du Muséum national d'histoire naturelle et du Jardin des plantes. He was President of the Institut international d'anthropologie (International Institute of Anthropology) and in 1930 President of the Société de statistique de Paris (Society of Statistics). He joined the Institut de France in 1945.

Mandates

Publications
Publications by Louis Marin include:

Notes

Sources

Further reading

External links

 

1871 births
1960 deaths
People from Meurthe-et-Moselle
Politicians from Grand Est
Republican Federation politicians
French Ministers of Pensions
French Ministers of Health
French Ministers of Liberated Regions
Members of the 8th Chamber of Deputies of the French Third Republic
Members of the 9th Chamber of Deputies of the French Third Republic
Members of the 10th Chamber of Deputies of the French Third Republic
Members of the 11th Chamber of Deputies of the French Third Republic
Members of the 12th Chamber of Deputies of the French Third Republic
Members of the 13th Chamber of Deputies of the French Third Republic
Members of the 14th Chamber of Deputies of the French Third Republic
Members of the 15th Chamber of Deputies of the French Third Republic
Members of the 16th Chamber of Deputies of the French Third Republic
Members of the Constituent Assembly of France (1945)
Members of the Constituent Assembly of France (1946)
Deputies of the 1st National Assembly of the French Fourth Republic
Grand Crosses of the Order of the White Lion